Arfan is a surname and male given name. Notable people with this name include:

 Arfan Akram (born 1983), cricket player
 Arfan Bhatti (born 1977), Norwegian Islamist
 Mohd Arfan Rashid (born 1991), Malaysian football player
 Muhammad Arfan (born 1998), Indonesian football player